Midleton Football Club is an Irish association football (soccer) club based in Midleton, County Cork. Their senior men's team currently plays in the Senior Premier Division of the Munster Senior League.

History

The club was founded on 6 June 1973, first playing at Rosary Place and wearing yellow and blue. Midleton F.C. joined the Cork Athletic Union League in September of that year. They finished second in 1978–79.

Midleton were named as FAI/Aviva Club of the Year in 2011–12 and were promoted to the Premier Division of the Munster Senior League and won it the following year. They have qualified for the FAI Cup on several occasions, reaching the Third Round in 2011.

Ground

The club grounds are Knockgriffin Park, located in the northwest of Midleton. The land was bought with money raised from selling Billy Woods to Coventry City in 1991.

Honours
Munster Senior League
Winners (3): 1990–91, 1991–92, 2017–18
Beamish Senior Cup
Winners (1): 2015–16
FAI/Aviva Club of the Year
Winners (1): 2011–12
Pop Kelleher Cup
Winners (1): 2009–10

Notable players
Billy Woods

References

External links
 Official page

1973 establishments in Ireland
Association football clubs established in 1973
Association football clubs in County Cork
Munster Senior League (association football) clubs
Midleton